The 2003 West Dorset District Council election was held on Thursday 1 May 2003 to elect councillors to West Dorset District Council in England. It took place on the same day as other district council elections in the United Kingdom. The entire council was up for election. Following boundary changes the number of wards were reduced by five, and the number of seats reduced from 55 to 48.

The 2003 election saw the Conservatives take majority control of the District Council.

Ward results

Beaminster

Bradford Abbas

Bradpole

Bridport North

Bridport South & Bothenhampton

Broadmayne

Broadwindsor

Burton Bradstock

Cam Vale

Charminster & Cerne Valley

Charmouth

Chesil Bank

Chickerell

Chideock & Symondsbury

Dorchester East

Dorchester North

Dorchester South

Dorchester West

Frome Valley

Halstock

Loders

Lyme Regis

Maiden Newton

Marshwood Vale

Netherbury

Owermoigne

Piddle Valley

Puddletown

Queen Thorne

Sherborne East

Sherborne West

Winterborne St Martin

Yetminster

References

West Dorset
2003
2000s in Dorset